The Uvod is a river in Ivanovo and Vladimir Oblasts in Russia, a left tributary of the Klyazma (Volga's basin). It has a length of 185 km, and the area of its drainage basin is 3,770 km2. The Uvod freezes up in November and breaks up in April. The towns of Ivanovo and Kokhma are located on the Uvod.

The main tributaries are Ukhtokhma and Vyasma.

References 

Rivers of Ivanovo Oblast
Rivers of Vladimir Oblast